Etymemazine is an antipsychotic, antihistamine and anticholinergic drug of the phenothiazine chemical class, structurally related to cyamemazine and methotrimeprazine.

Synthesis

Sodamide Sn2 alkylation between 2-ethylphenothiazine [61852-27-5] (1) and 1-dimethylamino-2-methyl-3-chloropropane [23349-86-2] (2) furnishes the Etymemazine (3).

References 

Phenothiazines
H1 receptor antagonists